Levert.Sweat.Gill is the debut studio album by American supergroup LSG. It was released by East West Records on November 11, 1997 in the United States. The album includes contributions from guest producers, including Sean "Puffy" Combs and Jermaine Dupri. The Lox, Faith Evans, Coko, Missy Elliott, LL Cool J, Busta Rhymes, MC Lyte, and Jazze Pha make guest appearances on the album. LSG peaked at number 4 on the US Billboard 200 and number 2 on the US Top R&B/Hip-Hop Albums. It was certified double platinum by the Recording Industry Association of America (RIAA).

Critical reception

Allmusic editor Leo Stanley wrote that "these guys know how to pick a good song and deliver it memorably. There are a few weak cuts scattered throughout the album, but they're so well crafted, they're easy to enjoy. But the true moments to treasure occur when everything falls into place — when they have a strong melody and lush production, LSG's voices blend in thrilling harmony and produce some truly affecting smooth R&B. And while its roots are certainly in old-fashioned, lover-man R&B, there's a distinct new flavor to the music [...] That helps make LSG's first album a satisfying debut indeed."

Track listing 

Notes
 denotes co-producer
Samples
"You Got Me" contains a sample from "Behind the Groove" as performed by Teena Marie.
"Curious" contains a sample from "Curious" as performed by Midnight Star.

Charts

Weekly charts

Year-end charts

Certifications

References

1997 debut albums
LSG (band) albums
East West Records albums
Albums produced by Jazze Pha
Albums produced by Jermaine Dupri
Albums produced by Sean Combs